Ernest Clark (1912–1994) was a British actor of stage, television and film.

Ernest Clark may also refer to:
Ernest Clark (governor) (1864–1951), British civil servant and Governor of Tasmania, 1933–1945
Ernie Clark (American football) (born 1937), American football player
Ernest Clark (athlete) (1898–1993), British track and field athlete
Ernie Clark (cinematographer), Australian cinematographer
Ernest Ellis Clark (1869–1932), Derby born artist for Crown Derby porcelain